The Vilnius bus network operates bus lines in Lithuanian capital city Vilnius. Up to 420 buses are working on working-days, 250 - on weekends.

History

On November 18, 1945, the Vilnius Bus Company, which buspark was succeeded by 17 old German and Soviet military buses. On March 13, the new regular bus line Žvėrynas - Railway Station, after all, other two lines were opened.

In 1964, the new depot of the existing bus fleet was built in Verkių street.

In 1995, the company was registered as a limited liability company Vilniaus autobusų parkas.

In 2003, company was renamed to Vilniaus autobusai.

In 2004, 90 new Volvo 7700 and Volvo 7700A buses were bought.

In 2011 Vilniaus Autobusai was joined with the trolleybus company Vilniaus Troleibusai and reorganised to Vilniaus viešasis transportas.

After the 2013 bus and trolleybus route reform, selected buses were stored at the second trolleybus depot in Viršuliškės. Also, due to lack of minibuses after the said reform, 12 Koch minibuses were purchased second-hand from Jelgava.

In 2013 and 2014, 19 Solaris Urbino 12 III CNG, 18 MAN A21 Lion's City NL273 CNG and 20 Castrosua City Versus CNG buses were bought.

From 2014 to 2017, several bus routes were handed out to private operators Transrevis, Ridvija which operated minibus routes and Meteorit Turas.

In 2017, a bus renewal period started, which lasted until the end of 2020. Many old buses were scrapped, some older buses were repainted and many new ones were purchased. These include:

 15 MAN A21 Lion's City NL273 and 15 MAN A23 Lion's City GL NG313 buses (second-hand from Oslo, which were originally built in 2008);
 100 Solaris Urbino 12 IV buses;
 50 Solaris Urbino 18 IV buses;
 50 MAN A23 Lion's City G NG313 CNG buses;
 10 Anadolu Isuzu Novo Citi Life buses;
 5 Karsan Jest Electric buses.

The private operators Ridvija and Meteorit Turas no longer operated any routes though Transrevis was given even more of them and replaced its buses with new ones:

 50 Scania Citywide LFA buses;
 70 Anadolu Isuzu Citibus buses.

List of operated buses

Night bus
The night bus route network in Vilnius was designed in 2006 to allow a safe journey from the city centre to the most densely populated neighbourhoods. At first the routes operates on all nights, however due to financial crisis, they were discontinued. At first, all tickets were valid on night buses, but starting from December 2006, night tickets were introduced, which could be purchased on the bus and no discounts were valid. In 2015  night buses were brought back on Friday to Saturday and Saturday to Sunday nights. In 2018, route 88N was introduced to transport passengers from the Vilnius airport to the city center and vice-versa. In 2020, due to COVID-19 pandemic, all night routes were discontinued, but 88N would be brought back the Summer of the same year. Other night routes were brought back in July 2022, it was an experiment to see if the ridership was big enough to resume operation, the final day of operation was September 4th. No further announcements were made regarding the change and the only regular night bus route in Vilnius is 88N. Rest of the night routes are only brought back for special events.

References

External links
 Official website

Bus transport in Vilnius
Companies based in Vilnius